Ercole (24 September 1562 – 29 November 1604) was Lord of Monaco from 17 May 1589 until his death on 29 November 1604 aged 42.

Ercole was the youngest of four sons of Honoré I (1522–1581) and Isabella Grimaldi. His eldest brother Charles II became Lord of Monaco on the death of their father in 1581. Ercole's two elder brothers Francois (1557–1586) and Horace (1558–1559) died in childhood, thus leaving Ercole as heir to his brother Charles II, who died without issue in 1589 at the age of 34. Ercole was 27 years old.

He married Maria Landi on 15 September 1595; the marriage produced three children;

Giovanna Maria Grimaldi (29 September 1596 – December 1620), married Gian Giacomo Teodoro Trivulzio, Conte di Melzo, Principe di Musocco.
Honoré II (Monaco, 24 December 1597 – Monaco, 10 January 1662) married Ippolita Trivulzio.
Maria Claudia Grimaldi, Carmelite nun in Genoa (1 January 1599 – 1668).

Ercole was murdered in 1604 and his six-year-old son Honoré became Lord of Monaco under the regency of Ercole's brother-in-law, Frederico Landi, 4th Prince of Val di Taro. Honoré was the first Lord of Monaco to be called Prince of Monaco.

References 

1562 births
1604 deaths
16th-century Lords of Monaco
17th-century Lords of Monaco
Burials at the Cathedral of Our Lady Immaculate
House of Grimaldi
Lords of Monaco
Assassinated Monegasque people
People murdered in Monaco
People of Ligurian descent